Yana Oleksandrivna Klochkova (born 7 August 1982) is a Ukrainian swimmer, who has won five Olympic medals in her career, with four of them being gold. She is Merited Master of Sports (1998),<ref name=emu2013>Vlaskov, A. Yana Klochkova. Encyclopedia of Modern Ukraine. 2013</ref> Hero of Ukraine (2004) and the most awarded Olympian from Ukraine.

Yana Klochkova set 50 Ukrainian records in 25- and 50-meter swimming pools at distances of 100, 200, 400 meters with integrated swimming; 200, 400 and 800 meters freestyle; 100 and 200 meters on the back; 200 meters butterfly and relay swimming. At the Olympic Games in Sydney, she set a world record in a 400-meter medley swimming and a European record in a 200-meter medley swimming.

 Biography 
She was born on 7 August 1982 in the city of Simferopol. She moved from there to Kharkiv, then to Kyiv.

Sports Society - "Dynamo", Major of the Ministry of Internal Affairs of Ukraine.

Coaches - Honored Trainer of Ukraine, Honored Worker of Physical Culture of Ukraine Nina Kozhukh and Honored Trainer of the USSR, Honored Worker of Physical Culture of Ukraine Alexander Kozhukh.

She retired in 2009 at the age of 26.

As of 2018, Yana has an 8-year-old son named Alex.

 Farewell to the track 
In January 2008, Klochkova announced her retirement from sports.

On 24 March 2009 in the Olympic swimming pool "Aquarena" in Kharkov on Klochkovskaya street, during the first stage of the Ukrainian Swimming Cup, with completely filled stands, Yana Klochkova's official "parting with water" took place. Officials (Mayor Mikhail Dobkin, Vice Governor Sergei Storozhenko, Head of the Ukrainian Swimming Federation Oleg Dyomin, two-time Olympic champion volleyball player Yuriy Poyarkov and many others) spoke about the swimmers, followed by the presentation of flowers and gifts from everyone. Klochkova, nicknamed "the goldfish" in Ukraine, was symbolically presented with an aquarium with a live goldfish.

In 2011, Yana Klochkova headed the Kyiv branch of the National Olympic Committee of Ukraine, but in 2012, without waiting for support for her initiatives from the executive committee of the Olympic Committee, she left this post.

Awards 
Her gold medals came in the 200 meter individual medley and the 400 meter individual medley at the 2000 and 2004 Summer Olympics; her silver medal came in the 800 meter freestyle at the 2000 Summer Olympics. She has also won ten titles at swimming's world championships, nineteen European championship titles. She currently holds the short-course world record in the 400 meter individual medley. Her 400 m individual medley world record was broken by American Katie Hoff at the 2007 World Championships in Melbourne.

On 28 July 2001, she won a silver medal by defeating Qi Hui of China in the women's 200-meter individual medley at the 2001 World Aquatics Championships in Fukuoka, Japan. The same year, she won gold medal for 400-meter individual medley at the same event and on two days later won another gold in the 400-meter freestyle. In 2003, she won four golds at the Summer Universiade in South Korea. In 2004, she was named by Swimming World magazine as the World Female Swimmer of the Year'' and the same year was awarded Hero of Ukraine medal by President Viktor Yanukovich.

Titles
Yana Klochkova's titles include:

Olympic Champion
2000, Sydney: 200 m individual medley
2000, Sydney: 400 m individual medley
2004, Athens: 200 m individual medley
2004, Athens: 400 m individual medley

World Champion, Long Course
2001, Fukuoka: 400 m freestyle
2001, Fukuoka: 400 m individual medley
2003, Barcelona: 200 m individual medley
2003, Barcelona: 400 m individual medley

World Champion, Short Course
1999, Hong Kong: 400 m individual medley
2000, Athens: 200 m individual medley
2000, Athens: 400 m individual medley
2002, Moscow: 400 m freestyle
2002, Moscow: 200 m individual medley
2002, Moscow: 400 m individual medley

European Champion, Long Course
1999, Istanbul: 200 m individual medley
1999, Istanbul: 400 m individual medley
2000, Helsinki: 400 m freestyle
2000, Helsinki: 200 m individual medley
2000, Helsinki: 400 m individual medley
2002, Berlin: 400 m freestyle
2002, Berlin: 200 m individual medley
2002, Berlin: 400 m individual medley
2004, Madrid: 200 m individual medley
2004, Madrid: 400 m individual medley

European Champion, Short Course
1999, Lisbon: 400 m freestyle
1999, Lisbon: 800 m freestyle
1999, Lisbon: 200 m individual medley
1999, Lisbon: 400 m individual medley
2000, Valencia: 200 m individual medley
2000, Valencia: 400 m individual medley
2001, Antwerp: 200 m individual medley
2002, Riesa: 200 m individual medley
2002, Riesa: 400 m individual medley

Universiade Champion, Long Course
2003, Daegu: 200 m freestyle
2003, Daegu: 200 m butterfly
2003, Daegu: 200 m individual medley
2003, Daegu: 400 m individual medley
2007, Bangkok: 400 m individual medley

Honorary titles 
"Person of the Year 2000" in the nomination "Sportsman of the Year".

"Person of the Year 2003" in the nomination "Sportsman of the Year".

Honorary Citizen of Kharkiv and Donetsk.

International championships (50 m)  

 
 Klochkova qualified from the heats, but scratched the semi finals

See also
World record progression 400 metres medley
List of multiple Olympic gold medalists
List of top Olympic gold medalists in swimming
List of individual gold medalists in swimming at the Olympics and World Aquatics Championships (women)

References

External links
All her results

1982 births
Living people
Sportspeople from Simferopol
Recipients of the title of Hero of Ukraine
Ukrainian female medley swimmers
Olympic swimmers of Ukraine
Swimmers at the 2000 Summer Olympics
Swimmers at the 2004 Summer Olympics
Olympic gold medalists for Ukraine
Olympic silver medalists for Ukraine
World record setters in swimming
Ukrainian female freestyle swimmers
Ukrainian female butterfly swimmers
World Aquatics Championships medalists in swimming
Medalists at the FINA World Swimming Championships (25 m)
European Aquatics Championships medalists in swimming
Medalists at the 2004 Summer Olympics
Dynamo sports society athletes
Medalists at the 2000 Summer Olympics
Olympic gold medalists in swimming
Olympic silver medalists in swimming
Universiade medalists in swimming
Universiade gold medalists for Ukraine
Universiade silver medalists for Ukraine
Medalists at the 2001 Summer Universiade
Medalists at the 2003 Summer Universiade
Medalists at the 2007 Summer Universiade
Recipients of the Order of Gold Star (Ukraine)
21st-century Ukrainian women